Rodney Hennon (born November 11, 1969) is an American college baseball coach, currently serving as head coach of the Georgia Southern Eagles baseball team.  He has held that position since the 2000 season.  He played at Western Carolina, where he earned All-Conference honors and helped the team to two NCAA Regional appearances.  He played professionally for one season with the Kentucky Rifles before turning to coaching.  He served as an assistant coach at Western Carolina for four years before ascending to the top job.  After two seasons, he moved to Georgia Southern.  In his first two seasons with the Eagles he was named Southern Conference Baseball Coach of the Year.

Head coaching record
Below is a table of the years that Hennon has been a head coach.

See also
List of current NCAA Division I baseball coaches

References

External links

1969 births
Living people
Georgia Southern Eagles baseball coaches
Western Carolina Catamounts baseball coaches
Western Carolina Catamounts baseball players
Baseball outfielders
People from Dalton, Georgia
Baseball coaches from Georgia (U.S. state)